Rubén Jesús Kihuen Bernal (born April 25, 1980) is an American politician and former member of the United States House of Representatives for , serving from 2017 to 2019. A member of the Democratic Party, he previously was a member of the Nevada Senate from 2006 to 2016. He was Nevada's first Latino member of the U.S. House of Representatives and Kihuen described himself as the first "Dreamer" elected to Congress. In December 2017, House Minority Leader Nancy Pelosi called on Kihuen to resign in response to sexual misconduct allegations against him by a female campaign staff member, as reported by BuzzFeed. He refused to resign but did not run for reelection in 2018.

Early life and education
Rubén Jesús Kihuen Bernal was born in Guadalajara, Mexico. His family moved to the United States in 1988. Kihuen's grandfather was an immigrant to Mexico from Lebanon who married a native Mexican. His father Armando Kihuen was a laborer in Orange County, California, before moving to Las Vegas in the 1990s and becoming a middle school science teacher. Kihuen attended Rancho High School and was named the 1997–1998 Nevada "soccer player of the year."

Ruben graduated from the University of Nevada, Las Vegas with a Bachelor of Science degree in education. While in high school and college, Kihuen volunteered for the campaigns of Senator Harry Reid, Virginia Governor Mark Warner, and Houston Mayor Lee Brown. As of 2011, Kihuen was enrolled in the Master of Public Administration degree program at the University of Oklahoma.

Early career 
In 2002, Kihuen became a deputy field director for the Nevada Democratic Party. He then served as regional representative to Senate Majority Leader Harry Reid. He then worked as student recruiter and academic advisor for the College of Southern Nevada (CSN). He is a past member of the Clark County Community Development Advisory Committee and the North Las Vegas Citizen's Advisory Committee.

Nevada legislature 
Kihuen was first elected to the State Assembly in 2006, defeating incumbent Bob McCleary by a large margin (and with the support of the AFL-CIO) in a 3-way primary.  The primary was shrouded by a scandal surrounding McCleary's payment of $500 to David Adams, the third candidate in the race, who had briefly dropped out after the payment; Adams described the payment as a bribe while McCleary insisted that the payment had been compensation to work on his campaign.  Kihuen was unopposed in the general election.

Kihuen served two terms before successfully running in 2010 to the Nevada State Senate after the incumbent was term-limited. During the 76th legislative session in 2011 he was the chair of the Senate Select Committee on Economic Growth and Employment. In the 77th legislative session in 2013, he chaired the Senate Standing Committee on Revenue and Economic Development and served as Majority Whip for the Democrats in the Senate.

U.S. House of Representatives

Elections

2012 

In September 2011, Kihuen announced his intention to run to represent Nevada's 1st congressional district but withdrew a month before filing opened in February 2012, allowing former Representative Dina Titus to run without a contested primary.

2016 

He defeated seven other candidates in the Democratic primary on June 14, 2016. Kihuen spoke at the 2016 Democratic National Convention, the only 2016 House recruit to do so. During the campaign, Kihuen was on leave from his job at the Las Vegas-based public relations firm the Ramirez Group.

Kihuen was criticized early in the campaign for still residing in the 1st district rather than the 4th.

Kihuen won the election by a vote of 128,680 (48.5%) to 118,220 (44.5%).  While Hardy carried six of the district's seven counties, Kihuen easily defeated Hardy in the district's share of Clark County, winning it by over 24,000 votes.

Tenure

Committee assignments 
Committee on Financial Services
 Subcommittee on Housing and Insurance
 Subcommittee on Terrorism and Illicit Finance

Caucus memberships 
 Congressional Hispanic Caucus
 Congressional LGBT Equality Caucus
 Congressional Progressive Caucus
New Democrat Coalition
Congressional Asian Pacific American Caucus

Sexual misconduct allegations 

On December 1, 2017, a 25-year-old woman who served as finance director of Kihuen's 2016 congressional campaign accused him of sexual harassment and unwanted touching.  The woman, who joined Kihuen's campaign in June 2015 and left in April 2016, alleges that Kihuen's behavior began in February, that he repeatedly requested that she go on dates or have sexual intercourse with him, and on two occasions forcibly touched her thighs without consent.

Upon resigning from the campaign in April, the woman reported to a mid-level staffer at the Democratic Congressional Campaign Committee that Kihuen had made her feel "uncomfortable", without offering any further details.  The mid-level staffer proceeded to confer with another mid-level staffer, who in turn called Kihuen's campaign manager, Dave Chase, and informed him of the woman's discomfort around Kihuen.  Chase then confronted Kihuen, who denied that anything had occurred.

In addition to the finance director's conversation with the DCCC operative, she also documented Kihuen's behavior in a series of March 10, 2016 text messages to a friend, and shared contemporaneous details of her departure with four other individuals at the time. When asked about the accusations, Kihuen said, "I sincerely apologize for anything that I may have said or done that made her feel uncomfortable".

On December 13, 2017, a second woman accused Kihuen of sexual misconduct. The woman, who asked to remain anonymous, told The Nevada Independent that he touched her thighs or butt in three separate incidents, and has sent her hundreds of sexually suggestive text messages. As of December 13, Kihuen has yet to deny or confirm the allegation to the Independent. A third woman accused Kihuen of improper touching.

In November 2018, the House Ethics Committee formally sanctioned Kihuen, determining he "made persistent and unwanted advances towards women". The report noted that "each of the complainant’s allegations were supported by documentary evidence and some of the alleged incidents were corroborated by third-party witnesses."

Response 
The chair of the Democratic Congressional Campaign Committee, Ben Ray Luján, demanded Kihuen's resignation immediately after being presented with the allegations by BuzzFeed on December 1, saying that "If anyone is guilty of sexual harassment or sexual assault, they should not hold elected office, Congressman Kihuen should resign."

Luján further punished Kihuen by ordering his immediate removal from the DCCC's Frontline program for incumbents in vulnerable seats.

Luján was joined just after midnight on December 2 by House Democratic Leader Nancy Pelosi, who called for Kihuen's resignation and declared that "the young woman's documented account is convincing, and I commend her for the courage it took to come forward".

Nevada Democrats were quick to condemn Kihuen, although only Jacky Rosen, a fellow member of Congress, explicitly called for him to resign.  Aaron Ford, Kihuen's former leader in the Nevada State Senate, told reporters that he was "deeply disappointed and disturbed" by the allegations.  Perhaps the most scathing criticism came from Congresswoman Dina Titus, who said that "many believed Ruben had great potential, but unfortunately his personal behavior has jeopardized his political career" and that "zero tolerance means zero tolerance. Ruben needs to step up and do what's right for the people of Nevada".

Chase, who managed Kihuen's successful campaign but did not join his Washington office, told BuzzFeed that he believes the former finance director, and wishes that he "had known her specific allegations when I confronted Ruben after she left the campaign or in time to stop what took place".

Lucy Flores, who served alongside Kihuen in the Nevada Legislature and had been his Democratic primary opponent in 2016, said that she found the allegations unsurprising given his reputation in the legislature, where "even though he maintained a girlfriend, he was known to be very flirtatious and hands on" and that she had "personally witnessed him being grabby with young, attractive women".

Later in the day on December 5, Kihuen gave his first interview since the allegations to ABC News, in which he declared his refusal to resign, instead saying that he "finds it interesting" that Pelosi, Lujan, and the DCCC "knew about these allegations last year".  Kihuen went on to say that the DCCC and party leadership had investigated the allegations, but that "they didn't find anything, and they continued investing millions of dollars in my campaign".  This was immediately denied by both Pelosi's office, which said that "Leader Pelosi first learned of these allegations from BuzzFeed last week", and the DCCC, who called Kihuen's statement "not true", adding that the DCCC had been "presented with these disturbing facts for the first time last week, and the chair immediately called for his resignation".

On December 16, 2017, Kihuen announced that he would not seek re-election in 2018 but later claimed he was reconsidering this decision, however he later backtracked and decided not to run again. In January 2019, he ran for a Las Vegas City Council seat, but he was defeated in the primary coming in third.

Electoral history

Post legislative career
Ruben Kihuen became the External Relations Director for the Las Vegas non profit the Immigrant Home Foundation / Fundacion Casa de Los Migrantes after leaving the United States Congress. Among his duties there was publicizing a Covid vaccination drive among Spanish speaking immigrants and their families.

See also

List of Hispanic and Latino Americans in the United States Congress

References

External links 

 Rep. Ruben J. Kihuen official U.S. House website
 Ruben for Congress official campaign website
 
 
 

1980 births
21st-century American politicians
American politicians of Mexican descent
Democratic Party members of the United States House of Representatives from Nevada
Hispanic and Latino American members of the United States Congress
Hispanic and Latino American state legislators in Nevada
Living people
Democratic Party members of the Nevada Assembly
Mexican emigrants to the United States
Democratic Party Nevada state senators
Politicians from Carson City, Nevada
People from Guadalajara, Jalisco
Politicians from Las Vegas
People with acquired American citizenship
University of Nevada, Las Vegas alumni
University of Oklahoma alumni